SKL can stand for:

 Finnish Christian League (Suomen Kristillinen Liitto)
 Seekriegsleitung (Naval Warfare Command), Germany, WWI
 AN/PYQ-10 Simple Key Loader
 1. SKL, Premier A Slovenian Basketball League
 2. SKL, Slovenian Second Basketball League
 Serine-lysine-leucine, a peroxisome targeting signal 1 in protein targeting
 Singaperumal Koil railway station, Tamil Nadu, India (station code)
 Super Kabaddi League, Pakistan
 Intel Skylake CPU microarchitecture product suffix
 Sumerian King List